Raoul Joshua Hyman (born 12 May 1996) is a South African racing driver scheduled to compete in the Super Formula Championship for B-Max Racing. He is the 2022 Formula Regional Americas and 2018 F3 Asian Champion.

Career

Lower formulae 
Hyman made his car racing debut in 2013, competing in the BRDC Formula 4 Championship with HHC Motorsport. He finished seventh in the standings, having taken four podiums.

He returned to BRDC F4 in 2014, once again driving for HHC alongside Sennan Fielding and Will Palmer. The South African started his season out strongly, winning the season opener at Silverstone from pole position, before achieving the same feat weeks later at Brands Hatch, where he fended off a charging Arjun Maini in the closing laps. A pair of podiums at the next two events respectively followed, as Hyman elevated himself into the championship battle. However, scoring only one podium from the second round at Silverstone and none at Brands Hatch made him fall back compared to rivals Maini and George Russell. Nevertheless, Hyman ended his season strongly, winning at Donington Park and taking another victory and a second place at the final round in Snetterton, which meant that he finished third in the standings.

FIA Formula 3 European 
In 2015, Hyman progressed to the FIA Formula 3 European Championship, where he raced for Team West-Tec F3. The campaign proved to be disappointing, with Hyman taking a best finish of sixth at Monza, which resulted in 21st place in the overall standings.

Hyman partnered up with Carlin to contest European F3 the following year. However, following the season opener, Hyman left the series, having scored a solitary point.

GP3 Series 
After competing in a one-off round of the BRDC British F3 Championship the previous year, Hyman returned to a full-time race seat in 2017, driving for Campos Racing in the GP3 Series. Points at the season opener were followed by a victory during the Sprint Race in Austria, where the South African controlled his gap to rival Giuliano Alesi to take his first victory in nearly three years. This would end up being the highlight of Hyman's season, as he ended up 13th in the standings, having scored just two more points at the Hungaroring.

F3 Asian Championship 
For the 2018 season, Hyman would contest the inaugural season F3 Asian Championship, partnering Jake Hughes and Hon Chio Leong at Dragon HitechGP. Whilst Hughes, who only competed in three events, would win every race he competed in, Hyman would end up taking the title, having scored eleven podiums over the course of the campaign, which included a win at Ningbo, by a mere two points.

FIA Formula 3 
Having raced in the Toyota Racing Series at the start of the 2019 season, where he finished fourth in the standings with four podiums, Hyman planted himself into the newly formed FIA Formula 3 Championship, where he would drive for Sauber Junior Team by Charouz. He would end up having an unsuccessful season, finishing 22nd, with two points coming from the season finale at Sochi.

Formula Regional Americas 
Following a two-year hiatus from racing, which he called "two of the worst years I've ever had", Hyman returned in 2022, driving for TJ Speed Motorsports in the Formula Regional Americas Championship. The South African experienced a dominant campaign, in which he won eleven races, whilst only missing the podium twice. His title victory would earn him a $600,000 prize to compete in the Super Formula Championship.

Super Formula 
At the end of 2022, it was announced that Hyman would be driving for B-Max Racing in Super Formula the following year.

Personal life
Hyman was born in South Africa and moved to London, United Kingdom at 15. His father Christopher is also a racing driver.

He is a practicing Christian and has Indian ancestry.

Racing record

Racing career summary

* Season still in progress.

Complete BRDC Formula 4 Championship results 
(key) (Races in bold indicate pole position) (Races in italics indicate points for the fastest lap of top ten finishers)

Complete FIA Formula 3 European Championship results
(key) (Races in bold indicate pole position) (Races in italics indicate fastest lap)

Complete GP3 Series results
(key) (Races in bold indicate pole position) (Races in italics indicate fastest lap)

Complete F3 Asian Championship results
(key) (Races in bold indicate pole position) (Races in italics indicate fastest lap)

Complete Toyota Racing Series results 
(key) (Races in bold indicate pole position) (Races in italics indicate fastest lap)

Complete FIA Formula 3 Championship results
(key) (Races in bold indicate pole position; races in italics indicate points for the fastest lap of top ten finishers)

Complete Formula Regional Americas Championship results 
(key) (Races in bold indicate pole position) (Races in italics indicate fastest lap)

Complete Super Formula results
(key) (Races in bold indicate pole position; races in italics indicate fastest lap)

References

External links
 
 

1996 births
Living people
South African people of Indian descent
South African racing drivers
FIA Formula 3 European Championship drivers
GP3 Series drivers
Euroformula Open Championship drivers
Toyota Racing Series drivers
FIA Formula 3 Championship drivers
F3 Asian Championship drivers
Carlin racing drivers
BRDC British Formula 3 Championship drivers
Formula Regional Americas Championship drivers
Team West-Tec drivers
Campos Racing drivers
Hitech Grand Prix drivers
Charouz Racing System drivers
Super Formula drivers
Sauber Motorsport drivers
South African expatriate sportspeople in England
South African Christians
B-Max Racing drivers